Lieutenant-General Nicolaas Nieuwoudt MBChB  (1929–1989) was a South African military commander.  A medical doctor, he joined the South African Air Force's medical branch in 1960, after five years private practise.  He commanded the South African Medical Service, as Surgeon-General, from 1977 to 1988.  He also commanded the secretive South African chemical and biological weapons program, known as Project Coast from 1981 to 1988.

Education
He obtained a medical degree from the University of Pretoria

Honours and awards
He was awarded the following medals and decorations:
 1985
 1980
 1964
 1984
 1979
 1980The Order of Military Merit, degree 'Grand Officer' Paraguay

See also
List of South African military chiefs
South African Medical Service

References

Militaria - Official Professional Journal of the SADF (Vol 12/2: 1982)

1929 births
1989 deaths
Afrikaner people
South African military personnel of the Border War